Gavilimomab (also known as ABX-CBL) is a mouse monoclonal antibody intended for use as an immunosuppressive biologic treatment of glucocorticoid-resistant graft versus host disease. It binds to the antigen CD147.  Gavilimomab proved slightly less effective than standard antithymocyte globulin therapy.

It was originally developed by Abgenix, which was later acquired by Amgen.

References 

Monoclonal antibodies for tumors